Chuni may refer to:

North Caucasian Huns, mentioned by Dionysius Periegetes alongside the Suni and Unni (Uns).
Chuni, Republic of Dagestan, a rural locality in Dagestan, Russia
Chuni, Sichuan, a town in the Garzê Tibetan Autonomous Prefecture of Sichuan, China
The Punjabi name of a Dupatta.